The 1925 Springfield Red and White football team was an American football team that represented Springfield College during the 1925 college football season.  In its second season under head coach John L. Rothacher, the team compiled a 6–1–1 record, outscored opponents by a total of 145 to 52, and played its home games at Pratt Field in Springfield, Massachusetts. Boston Braves outfielder Leslie Mann served as an assistant coach.

Key players included halfback "Tex" Maddox, quarterback Bob Berry, fullback Mahnken, end Crawley. Center Robert G. Elliott was the team captain.

Schedule

References

Springfield
Springfield Pride football seasons
Springfield Red and White football